The 2014–15 Melbourne City FC season was the club's fifth season since its establishment in 2009, and its first season under the "Melbourne City" moniker, after being taken over and rebranded by Manchester City. The club participated in the A-League for the fifth time and the FFA Cup for the first time.

Players

Squad information

|-
|colspan="24"|Players no longer at the club:

From youth squad

Transfers in

Transfers out

Technical staff

Statistics

Squad statistics

|-
|colspan="19"|Players no longer at the club:

Pre-season and mid-season friendlies

Competitions

Overall

A-League

League table

Results summary

Results by round

Matches

Finals series

FFA Cup

Awards
 NAB Young Footballer of the Month (February) – Connor Chapman

References

External links
 Official Website

Melbourne City
Melbourne City FC seasons